Historical culture is a concept that encompasses "both material and immaterial culture as well as academic and popular articulations" of history.

References

Further reading

Culture
History